The X-Ray Imaging and Spectroscopy Mission (XRISM, pronounced "crism"), formerly the X-ray Astronomy Recovery Mission (XARM), is an X-ray astronomy satellite of the Japan Aerospace Exploration Agency (JAXA) to provide breakthroughs in the study of structure formation of the universe, outflows from galaxy nuclei, and dark matter. As the only international X-ray observatory project of its period, XRISM will function as a next generation space telescope in the X-ray astronomy field, similar to how the James Webb Space Telescope, Fermi Space Telescope, and the Atacama Large Millimeter Array (ALMA) Observatory are placed in their respective fields. The mission is a stopgap for avoiding a potential observation period gap between X-ray telescopes of the present (Chandra, XMM-Newton) and those of the future (Advanced Telescope for High Energy Astrophysics (ATHENA), Lynx X-ray Observatory). Without XRISM, a blank period in X-ray astronomy may arise in the early 2020s due to the loss of Hitomi. During its formulation, XRISM/XARM was also known as the "ASTRO-H Successor" or "ASTRO-H2".

Overview 

With the retirement of Suzaku in September 2015, and the detectors onboard Chandra X-ray Observatory and XMM-Newton operating for more than 15 years and gradually aging, the failure of Hitomi meant that X-ray astronomers will have a 13-year blank period in soft X-ray observation, until the launch of ATHENA in 2035. This may result in a major setback for the international community, as during the early 2020s, in other wavelengths studies performed by large scale observatories such as the James Webb Space Telescope and the Thirty Meter Telescope will commence, while there may be no telescope to cover the most important part of X-ray astronomy. A lack of new missions could also deprive young astronomers a chance to gain hands-on experience from participating in a project. Along with these reasons, motivation to recover science that was expected as results from Hitomi, became the rationale to initiate the XRISM project. XRISM  has been recommended by ISAS's Advisory Council for Research and Management, the High Energy AstroPhysics Association in Japan, NASA Astrophysics Subcommittee, NASA Science Committee, NASA Advisory Council.

With a planned launch in 2023, XRISM will recover the science that was lost with Hitomi, such as the structure formation of the universe, feedback from galaxies/active galaxy nuclei, and the history of material circulation from stars to galaxy clusters. The space telescope will also serve as a technology demonstrator for the European Advanced Telescope for High Energy Astrophysics (ATHENA) telescope. Multiple space agencies, including NASA and the European Space Agency (ESA) are participating in the mission. In Japan, the project is led by JAXA's Institute of Space and Astronautical Science (ISAS) division, and U.S. participation is led by NASA's Goddard Space Flight Center (GSFC). The U.S. contribution is expected to cost around US$80 million, which is about the same amount as the contribution to Hitomi.

Changes from Hitomi 
The X-ray Imaging and Spectroscopy Mission will be one of the first projects for ISAS to place a separate project manager (PM) and a primary investigator (PI). This measure was taken as part of ISAS's reform in project management to prevent the recurrence of the Hitomi accident. In traditional ISAS missions, the PM was also responsible for tasks that would typically be allocated to PI's in a NASA mission.

A team of astronomers from GSFC suggests pairing the XRISM satellite with a source satellite containing radioactive sources. XRISM will observe the source sat to conduct absolute calibration of its telescopes, thus functioning as an in-orbit X-ray "standard candle". With its broad effective area, the telescope could potentially establish several standard candles in the sky by observing constant celestial sources. If this concept proves successful, later missions such as ATHENA and Lynx may have their own source sats.

While Hitomi had an array of instruments spanning from soft X-ray to soft gamma ray, XRISM will focus around the Resolve instrument (equivalent to Hitomi SXS), as well as Xtend (SXI), which has a high affinity to Resolve. The elimination of a hard X-ray telescope is based on the launch of NASA's NuSTAR satellite, a development that was not put to consideration when the NeXT proposal was initially formulated. NuSTAR's spatial and energy resolution is analogous to Hitomi hard X-ray instruments. Once XRISM operation starts, collaborative observations with NuSTAR will likely be essential. Meanwhile, the scientific value of the soft and hard X-ray band width boundary has been noted; therefore the option of upgrading XRISM instruments to be partially capable of hard X-ray observation is under consideration. Furthermore, a hard X-ray telescope proposal with abilities surpassing Hitomi has also been proposed. The FORCE (Focusing On Relativistic universe and Cosmic Evolution) space telescope is a candidate for the next ISAS competitive medium class mission. If selected, FORCE is to be launched after the mid-2020s, with an eye towards conducting simultaneous observations with ATHENA.

History 
Following the premature termination of the Hitomi mission, on 14 June 2016 JAXA announced their proposal to rebuild the satellite. The XARM pre-project preparation team was formed in October 2016. In the U.S. side, formulation began in the summer of 2017. In June 2017, ESA announced that they will participate in XRISM as a mission of opportunity.

Instruments 
XRISM will carry two instruments for studying the soft X-ray energy range, Resolve and Xtend. The satellite will have telescopes for each of the instruments, SXT-I (Soft X-ray Telescope for Imager) and SXT-S (Soft X-ray Telescope for Spectrometer).

Resolve 
Resolve is an X-ray micro calorimeter developed by NASA and the Goddard Space Flight Center. The instrument will likely not be a complete remanufacture of Hitomi SXS, as there are some space-qualified hardware left from developing SXS, and these spare parts may be utilized to build Resolve.

Xtend 
Xtend is an X-ray CCD camera. Unlike Resolve, which will be a "built-to-print" version of its predecessor, Xtend differs in that its energy resolution will be improved from Hitomi SXI.

See also 

 Suzaku
 List of X-ray space telescopes
 X-ray astronomy

Notes

References

External links 
 XRISM official website
 X-Ray Imaging and Spectroscopy Mission (XRISM) at JAXA
 X-ray Imaging and Spectroscopy Mission at NASA Goddard Space Flight Center
 Beyond the loss of Hitomi 

Space telescopes
Satellites of Japan
X-ray telescopes
2023 in spaceflight
Explorers Program